Paravia may refer to:

 Pier Alessandro Paravia (1797-1857), Venetian writer, scholar, philanthropist and professor of Italian eloquence 
 Antonio Paravia (bornv1951), Italian politician and intrapreneur
 Vittorio Paravia (born 1943), Italian entrepreneur
 Santa Paravia en Fiumaccio, a video game in which each player becomes the ruler of a fledgling Italian city-state in 1400